Casino Rama is a large casino, hotel, and entertainment complex located in the town of Rama, Ontario on the reserve land of the Chippewas of Rama First Nation. It is jointly owned by the Chippewas of Rama First Nation and the Ontario Lottery and Gaming Corporation, with operation of the casino contracted to Gateway Casinos & Entertainment Limited.

Casino Rama is Ontario's only First Nations "commercial casino" (as opposed to a lesser class, charity casino) and the largest First Nations casino in Canada.  The casino also includes restaurants, a hotel and spa, and an entertainment complex which regularly hosts ticketed shows (for an additional charge).

History
The casino opened on July 31, 1996.

In 2007, a group of people, including several of the casino's employees, were arrested after police investigated a $2 million scam involving cheating at baccarat.

In 2013, Casino Rama underwent a multimillion-dollar renovation.

In November, 2016, the resort was the victim of a cyber attack, and financial and personal information about customers was stolen from the company's records.

Casino Rama temporarily closed on March 16, 2020 due to COVID-19 regulations. 

Casino Rama announced its reopening in the light of the Covid-19 situation at the beginning of July 2021 and reopened on July 29.

Facilities

The resort consists of a 289-room hotel, a casino with a  floor, a 5,000-seat Entertainment Centre, and ten restaurants.  The casino has 2500 slot machines and  110 table games.

Events

Combat sports
Casino Rama has hosted a number of live boxing events, titled Rumble at Rama. On April 2, 2011, Casino Rama hosted what was promoted as the first sanctioned mixed martial arts (MMA) event in Ontario, taking place 4 weeks before UFC 129 in Toronto. This was not entirely correct, as an MMA event was held in the Six Nations of the Grand River First Nation 3 years prior, where Dan Severn defeated Ian Asham in the main event; 7 MMA events were staged before the event at Casino Rama.
In July 2011, it hosted a Bellator Fighting Championships event.

Concerts

The 5,036-seat Entertainment Centre has hosted a variety of stars including: Mariah Carey, Laura Pausini, Christina Aguilera, Journey, Air Supply, Alice Cooper, Diana Ross, Johnny Mathis, Kelly Clarkson, Creed, 3 Doors Down, Eric Burdon, The Searchers, Faith Hill, David Cook, Celtic Thunder taped two shows here,  Deep Purple, Gloria Estefan, Men at Work, Jay Leno, Jewel, Carrie Underwood, Chicago, Olivia Newton-John, Vince Gill, Tony Bennett, Bill Cosby, Styx, Michael Bolton, Ringo Starr, Neil Sedaka, Jeff Foxworthy, LeAnn Rimes, Alicia Keys - 2005, Art Garfunkel, Clint Black, David Copperfield, Petula Clark, Roger Hodgson, ZZ Top, Bad Company, Dolly Parton, The Guess Who, George Thorogood, Heart, Steve Miller, Tom Jones, New Kids on the Block, Smokey Robinson, Stone Temple Pilots, CCR, Hall & Oates, Lionel Richie, Weezer, Terra Naomi, Whitesnake and KISS. Judas Priest, Big & Rich, Gretchen Wilson, Brad Paisley, John Legend, Rick Springfield, Kelly Pickler, Miranda Lambert, Sugarland, Doc Walker, Trace Adkins, Blake Shelton, Huey Lewis & The News, Wayne Brady, Larry The Cable Guy, Tim Allen, Joe Nichols, Wynonna and the Big Noise.

Dozens of Hong Kong Cantopop stars and television personalities have held concerts at Rama as part of a Toronto tour including but not limited to:

 Vivian Chow, 2013
 Elisa Chan & Maria Cordero, 2013
 Sandy Lam, 2013
 Raymond Lam, 2012
 Joey Yung, 2012
 Twins, 2011

See also
 List of casinos in Canada
Ontario Lottery and Gaming Corporation

References

External links
Official Casino Rama Site

Casinos in Ontario
Buildings and structures in Simcoe County
Tourist attractions in Simcoe County
Raymond Moriyama buildings
Music venues in Ontario
Casino hotels
Hotels in Ontario
1996 establishments in Ontario
Casinos completed in 1996
First Nations in Ontario